Capo Rizzuto Lighthouse is an active lighthouse located on the promontory with the same name in the municipality of Isola di Capo Rizzuto in Calabria on the Ionian Sea.

Description
The lighthouse is completely automated and is operated by the Marina Militare with the identification code number 3396 E.F.

See also
 List of lighthouses in Italy
 Isola di Capo Rizzuto

References

External links
 Servizio Fari Marina Militare 

Lighthouses in Italy
Lighthouses completed in 1906
Buildings and structures in the Province of Crotone
1906 establishments in Italy